Paolo "Paul" Scurti was an Italian-American soccer midfielder who spent five seasons in the North American Soccer League and earned one cap with the United States men's national soccer team.

Professional
Scurti moved to the United States with his family when he was eleven.  In 1972, he signed with the Baltimore Bays of the American Soccer League.  In 1974, he moved to the Baltimore Comets of the North American Soccer League.  He played the 1974 and 1975 NASL seasons in Baltimore, and moved along with the team when it became the San Diego Jaws for the 1976 season.  He played the 1978 season with the California Surf but played only two games with them.

National team
Scurti earned his one cap with the national team in a 7-0 loss to Poland on March 26, 1975.  He started the game, but was taken off for Pat McBride in the 62nd minute.  He also played an unofficial game, a 10-0 loss to Italy on April 2, 1975.  In that game, he came off at halftime for Alex Skotarek.

References

1951 births
Sportspeople from the Province of Pescara
American Soccer League (1933–1983) players
American soccer players
Baltimore Bays (1972–73) players
Baltimore Comets players
California Surf players
Living people
Italian emigrants to the United States
North American Soccer League (1968–1984) indoor players
North American Soccer League (1968–1984) players
San Diego Jaws players
United States men's international soccer players
Association football midfielders
Footballers from Abruzzo
People from Spoltore